Acacia thoma is a shrub belonging to the genus Acacia and the subgenus Juliflorae that is endemic to arid areas of western Australia.

Description
Bark on the upper branches is smooth and grey but becomes rough and longitudinally fissured at the base. It has light green new shoots with rudimentary caducous stipules that are resinous but not sticky. Like most species of Acacia it has phyllodes rather than true leaves. They are flat and straight to shallowly incurved with many parallel longitudinal fine nerves.

Taxonomy
The plant is named for Emil Thoma, a Botanical Advisor with Rio Tinto Iron Ore, who assisted Maslin and provided samples and information on the species.

Distribution
It is native to an area in the Mid West, Goldfields and Pilbara regions of Western Australia where it has a scattered distribution from the Pilbara region in the from the east of Paraburdoo north down to around Meekatharra in the south west and Leinster in the south extending out to around Mount Nossiter in the Little Sandy Desert in the eastern edge of its range. It is often situated on ridges and rocky slopes near the base of ranges composed  of banded ironstone growing in skeletal soils as a part of open shrubland communities where it is usually associated with Acacia aneura, Acacia sibirica and Eremophila jucunda.

See also
List of Acacia species

References

thoma
Acacias of Western Australia
Taxa named by Bruce Maslin
Plants described in 2008